Monarto South railway station was located on the Adelaide to Wolseley line serving the South Australian town of Monarto South.

History
On 13 October 1919, Monarto South became a junction station with the opening of the Sedan line. It briefly became a break of gauge station in 1995 when the Adelaide to Wolseley line was gauge converted to standard gauge. This ceased when the Sedan line was also converted as far as its then terminus at Apamurra in November 1995.
After standardisation, the station was demolished with the station building being preserved at the Old Tailem Town Pioneer Village. The yard used for grain trains have fallen into disuse and trucks now transport grain from the silos, but a 1,550 metre crossing loop remains in use.

References

External links
Johhny Pages' gallery

Disused railway stations in South Australia